Kenneth Lonergan is an American playwright, director, and screenwriter known for his work in film and television.

He has received four Academy Award nominations three for Best Original Screenplay for You Can Count on Me (2000), Gangs of New York (2002), and Manchester by the Sea (2016) winning for the later. He has also received three Tony Award nominations for Best Revival for a Play for This is Our Youth in 2015, Lobby Hero in 2018, and The Waverly Gallery in 2019.

Major associations

Academy Awards

Tony Awards

Theatre awards

Drama Desk Award

Pulitzer Prize

Olivier Award

Outer Critics Circle Award

Industry awards

BAFTA Awards

Golden Globe Awards

Directors Guild Awards

Writers Guild Awards

Miscellaneous awards

References 

Lonergan, Kenneth